"Is That Your Chick (The Lost Verses)" is the second single from Memphis Bleek's second album, The Understanding. The single version featured Jay-Z and Missy Elliott. The album version featured a verse from Twista and another verse from Jay-Z. The song was produced by Timbaland and was released in 2000.  The original version of the song appeared on the European (but not American) version of Jay-Z's Vol. 3...Life and Times of S. Carter.  Memphis Bleek later recorded verses for the song, and it was released as the second single from Bleek's The Understanding.  In the alternate version the chorus is changed from "Cause that's Jay and them..." to "Cause that's Bleek and them...".

The song is also noted to be Bleek's last song to chart officially on Billboard Hot 100.

Music video

The official music video for the song was directed by Chris Robinson. The video version of the song is condensed to Bleek's 2 verses & 1 Jay-Z verse. Twista does not appear in the video.

Charts

Weekly charts

Year-end charts

References

2000 songs
Jay-Z songs
Memphis Bleek songs
Missy Elliott songs
Music videos directed by Jeremy Rall
Roc-A-Fella Records singles
Song recordings produced by Timbaland
Songs written by Bryan-Michael Cox
Songs written by Missy Elliott
Songs written by Jay-Z